The 1994 Danone Hardcourt Championships was a women's tennis tournament played on outdoor hard courts at the Milton Tennis Centre in Brisbane, Australia that was part of Tier III of the 1994 WTA Tour. The tournament was held from 3 through 9 January 1994. Second-seeded Lindsay Davenport won the singles title and earned $27,000 first-prize money.

Finals

Singles

 Lindsay Davenport defeated  Florencia Labat 6–1, 2–6, 6–3
 It was Davenport's 1st title of the year and the 2nd of her career.

Doubles

 Laura Golarsa /  Natalia Medvedeva defeated  Jenny Byrne /  Rachel McQuillan 6–3, 6–1
 It was Golarsa's only title of the year and the 4th of her career. It was Medvedeva's only title of the year and the 14th of her career.

External links
 ITF tournament edition details
 Tournament draws

Danone Hardcourt Championships
Danone Hardcourt Championships
Dan
Danone Hardcourt Championships, 1989
Danone Hardcourt Championships
Sports competitions in Brisbane
Tennis in Queensland